Francesco Bossi (1525 – 18 September 1583) was a Roman Catholic prelate who served as Bishop of Novara (1579–1583), Bishop of Perugia (1574–1579), and Bishop of Gravina (1568–1574).

Biography
Francesco Bossi was born in Milan in 1525.
On 2 August 1568, he was appointed during the papacy of Pope Pius V as Bishop of Gravina. On 28 August 1568, he was consecrated bishop by Otto Truchseß von Waldburg, Bishop of Augsburg. On 5 May 1574, he was appointed during the papacy of Pope Gregory XIII as Bishop of Perugia. On 21 October 1579, he was appointed during the papacy of Pope Gregory XIII as Bishop of Novara. He served as Bishop of Novara until his death on 18 September 1583.

While bishop, he was the principal co-consecrator of Ottavio Santacroce, Bishop of Cervia (1576), and Ottaviano Paravicini, Bishop of Alessandria (della Paglia) (1584).

See also 
Catholic Church in Italy

References

External links and additional sources
 (for Chronology of Bishops) 
 (for Chronology of Bishops) 
 (for Chronology of Bishops) 
 (for Chronology of Bishops) 
 (for Chronology of Bishops) 
 (for Chronology of Bishops) 

16th-century Italian Roman Catholic bishops
Bishops appointed by Pope Pius V
Bishops appointed by Pope Gregory XIII
1525 births
1583 deaths